Robert Harold Cleghorn (27 December 1912 – 10 October 1996) was a weightlifting competitor for New Zealand.

He won the gold medal at the 1950 British Empire Games in the men's 110 kg division. At the 1954 British Empire Games, he won the bronze medal in the same event.

He represented New Zealand at the 1952 Summer Olympics where he placed 7th overall in the men's heavyweight.

Cleghorn won 11 New Zealand national weightlifting championship titles: in the heavyweight division in consecutive years from 1937 to 1940, and then again from 1949 to 1954; and the middle heavyweight division in 1955.

References

1912 births
1996 deaths
New Zealand male weightlifters
Olympic weightlifters of New Zealand
Weightlifters at the 1952 Summer Olympics
Commonwealth Games gold medallists for New Zealand
Commonwealth Games bronze medallists for New Zealand
Weightlifters at the 1950 British Empire Games
Weightlifters at the 1954 British Empire and Commonwealth Games
Commonwealth Games medallists in weightlifting
20th-century New Zealand people
Medallists at the 1950 British Empire Games
Medallists at the 1954 British Empire and Commonwealth Games